Javier Castrilli (born May 22, 1957) is a former football referee from Buenos Aires, Argentina.

He worked as a referee from 1980 to 1998, earning the nickname El Sheriff due to his character and decisions on the field by strictly imposing the rules of the game. Castrilli was notorious for officiating a league match between River Plate and Newell's Old Boys in May 1992. He issued four red cards to River Plate players, and also issued a red card to the club's manager Daniel Passarella.

He was a referee in the 1998 World Cup held in France.

Castrilli entered politics and is director the Argentine Ministry of Internal Affairs' program of security at football events (ProSEF). He ran for mayor of Buenos Aires.

References

External links
 Biography at La voz del Interior newspaper (in Spanish)

1957 births
Argentine football referees
Sportspeople from Buenos Aires
Living people
FIFA World Cup referees
Copa América referees
1998 FIFA World Cup referees